Gompelia is a genus of beetles belonging to the family Aderidae.

The species of this genus are found in Europe.

Species:
 Gompelia flaveola (Mulsant & Rey, 1866) 
 Gompelia neglecta (Jacquelin du Val, 1863)

References

Aderidae